John Edwin Moorwood (July 1896 – 1 June 1963) was an English footballer who played in the Football League for Stoke.

Career
Moorwood was born in Sheffield and began his career with Alfreton United before joining Stoke in 1920. He played nine matches in the Football League for Stoke during the 1920-21 season as the team narrowly avoided relegation. He left at the end of the season and joined Welsh side Wrexham where he spent two years before leaving for Bangor City. Form there they went on to play for a number of pub teams around the Sheffield area including Gleadless, Sheffield Forge and Woodhouse WMC.

Career statistics
Source:

References

1896 births
1963 deaths
Footballers from Sheffield
English footballers
Association football defenders
Alfreton Town F.C. players
Stoke City F.C. players
Wrexham A.F.C. players
Bangor City F.C. players
English Football League players